Nikola Tolimir (born 1 April 1989 in Slovenj Gradec) is a Slovenian football midfielder.

References

1986 births
Living people
Sportspeople from Slovenj Gradec
Slovenian footballers
Association football midfielders
Slovenian PrvaLiga players
NK Rudar Velenje players
Slovenian expatriate footballers
Expatriate footballers in Romania
Slovenian expatriate sportspeople in Romania
CSM Ceahlăul Piatra Neamț players
Liga I players
Expatriate footballers in Cyprus
Slovenian expatriate sportspeople in Cyprus
Enosis Neon Paralimni FC players
Cypriot First Division players
Slovenia under-21 international footballers
Slovenia youth international footballers